Konstanty Plisowski of Odrowąż (8 June 1890 – 1940) was a Polish general and military commander. He was the Commander in the battle of Jazłowiec and the battle of Brześć Litewski. He was murdered on Stalin's orders in the Katyn massacre.

Biography 

Konstanty Plisowski was born on 8 June 1890 in his family village of Nowosiółki in Podolia, to a family of szlachta ancestry of Odrowąż coat of arms. In 1908 he joined the army of Russia, where he served with distinction until 1917. During World War I, Plisowski was transferred to the 1st Polish Corps and since 1917 served as a commander of the cavalry regiment attached to the Polish 4th Rifle Division under general Lucjan Żeligowski. After Poland regained her independence in 1918, he joined the Polish Army. The following year, during the Polish-Ukrainian War he was assigned to the 14th Uhlans Regiment as its commanding officer. He became famous as a cavalry commander after the Jazłowiec cavalry charge (11 July 1919) that became part of the popular culture as one of the synonyms of bravery.

During the Polish-Bolshevik War of 1920 Plisowski was served as a commander of 6th cavalry brigade and later of 8th cavalry brigade. He was also briefly the commanding officer of Rómmel's 1st Cavalry Division. He took part in the famous Battle of Komarów. After the war he remained in the army and served at various command posts. At the same time he was also a professor of tactics at the Higher War School in Warsaw. On 4 January 1929 he was promoted to generał brygady, but in 1930 was demobilised and retired due to his poor health.

During the Polish Defensive War of 1939 Plisowski found himself in Brześć, where he volunteered for the army. He was made the commander of the Brześć Fortress and managed to organise resistance against the advancing German XIX Panzer Corps of general Heinz Guderian. After the unconcluded Battle of Brześć, in which his four infantry battalions managed to halt the advance of four German divisions for four days, Plisowski retreated with his men and joined the forces of general Franciszek Kleeberg. He was assigned to the Cavalry Operational Group of general Władysław Anders as his deputy. On 24 September he was made the commanding officer of the Nowogródzka Cavalry Brigade, with which he fought both against Nazi Germany and the Soviet Union.

Katyn
On 28 September 1939 he was taken prisoner of war by the Soviets and sent to the Starobielsk prison camp. Following the orders of Joseph Stalin, he was murdered in Kharkov in the spring of 1940, aged forty-nine, in what became known as the Katyn Massacres. Place of his burial remains unknown. Among the Katyn victims were 14 Polish generals including Leon Billewicz, Bronisław Bohatyrewicz, Xawery Czernicki (admiral), Stanisław Haller, Aleksander Kowalewski, Henryk Minkiewicz, Kazimierz Orlik-Łukoski, Rudolf Prich (murdered in Lviv), Franciszek Sikorski, Leonard Skierski, Piotr Skuratowicz, Mieczysław Smorawiński and Alojzy Wir-Konas (promoted posthumously). Since 20 March 1996, the Polish 6th Armoured Cavalry Brigade is named after him.

Promotions
 Major –
 Colonel – 23 August 1919
 Brigadier General – 4 January 1929
 Major General – 9 November 2007 (posthumously)

Honours and awards
 Silver Cross of the Virtuti Militari (1921)
 Chevalier of the Legion of Honour (France, 1921)
 Order of Saint George, 4th class
 Order of the White Eagle

References

1890 births
1940 deaths
Polish generals
Katyn massacre victims
Polish people of the Polish–Soviet War
Polish people of World War II
Polish military personnel of World War II
Polish Army officers
Polish military personnel killed in World War II
Polish prisoners of war
World War II prisoners of war held by the Soviet Union
Recipients of the Silver Cross of the Virtuti Militari
Chevaliers of the Légion d'honneur
Executed military leaders
Imperial Russian Army personnel
People from the Russian Empire of Polish descent
Recipients of the Order of the White Eagle (Poland)